The 1989 IIHF European Women Championships (ice hockey) was held April 4–9, 1989, in West Germany, the first European Championship to be held. Finland won their first title with a 7–1 victory over neighbours Sweden in the Final. The hosts West Germany picked up the bronze after edging past Norway on penalty shots.

Qualification tournament

Ten teams entered the championship. Of these, the top six ranked teams received a bye to the final tournament. These were:

The final four sides played in Qualification matches. A two-leg aggregate playoff was played with the winners of the two matches taking the final two places.

 The Netherlands won the qualifier 8-4 on aggregate.

 Czechoslovakia won the qualifier 5-2 on aggregate.

Final tournament

The eight participating teams were divided up into two seeded groups as below. The teams played each other once in a single round robin format. The top two teams from the group proceeded to the Final Round, while the remaining teams played in the consolation round.

First round

Group A

Standings

Results
All times local (GMT+4)

Group B

Standings

Results
All times local (GMT+4)

Playoff round

Consolation round 5–8 place

Consolation round 7–8 place

Consolation round 5–6 place

Final round

Semifinals

Match for 3-4 Place

Final

Champions

Final standings

See also
IIHF European Women Championships

External links
 Hockey Archives - Championnats d'Europe féminins 1989 

IIHF European Women Championships
Euro
Euro
1989
1989 in West German women's sport
Sports competitions in Düsseldorf
1980s in Düsseldorf
IIHF European Women Championships